The Golden Greats is a greatest hits album by the British glam rock band Sweet, released in 1977. Their second UK compilation album after The Sweet's Biggest Hits which featured their hits in 1971/72, this album features all of their UK singles from 1973 to 1977 although the last three, "Lost Angels", "Fever of Love" and "Stairway to the Stars" failed to chart in the UK or the US. They were to return to the top ten in the UK and US the following year with their final hit single "Love Is Like Oxygen" from the Level Headed album.

Track listing

Side one
"Block Buster!" - 3:12
"Hellraiser" - 3:15
"Ballroom Blitz" - 4:07
"Teenage Rampage" - 3:32
"The Six Teens" - 4:06
"Turn It Down" - 3:30

Written by Nicky Chinn and Mike Chapman. Tracks 1-4 produced by Phil Wainman. Track 5 produced by Nicky Chinn, Mike Chapman and Phil Wainman. Track 6 produced by Nicky Chinn and Mike Chapman.

Side two
"Fox on the Run" - 3:24
"Action" - 3:44
"Lost Angels" - 4:02
"The Lies in Your Eyes" - 3:48
"Fever of Love" - 4:03
"Stairway to the Stars" - 3:05

Written and produced by Sweet.
The Golden Greats featured all the RCA singles from "Block Buster!" to "Stairway to the Stars" in chronological order except that "Lost Angels" was placed before "The Lies in Your Eyes" in the track listing either as a record company error or because it was assumed the playlist sounded better that way.

References

The Sweet albums
1977 compilation albums
Albums produced by Phil Wainman
Albums produced by Mike Chapman
RCA Records compilation albums
Glam rock compilation albums